Yoon Joo-sang (born June 25, 1949) is a South Korean actor. In 2009, he won the Best Supporting Actor award during the 2009 KBS Drama Awards for his role in Iris.Filmography

FilmCane (Hoichori) (2011)Miss Gold Digger (2007)Happy Killing (2007)Radio Star (2006)King and the Clown (2005)Diary of June (2005) Duelist (2005)Thomas Ahn Jung-geun (2004) Spider Forest (2004) The President's Barber (2004)Arahan (2004) The Circle (2003)
Natural City (2003)
No Comment (2002)
Amygdala (2002)
This Is Law  (2001)
Guns & Talks (2001)
Dream of a Warrior (2001)
General Hospital the Movie: A Thousand Days (2000)
Phantom: The Submarine (1999)
The Ring Virus (1999) 
Shiri (1999)
The Happenings (1998)
Bitter and Sweet (1995)
The Taebaek Mountains (1994)

Television series
Mental Coach Jegal (2022) 
 Extraordinary Attorney Woo (2022) (Cameo, ep2) 
Move to Heaven (2021) (cameo, ep 8)
Revolutionary Sisters (2021)
Hello, Me! (2021)
The Uncanny Counter (2020)
Memorials (TV series) (2020)
365: Repeat the Year (2020)
Doctor John (2019)
Hide and Seek (2018)
Your House Helper (2018)
Radio Romance (2018)
The Secret of My Love (2017-2018)
Live Up to Your Name (2017)
Second to Last Love (2016)
The Good Wife (2016)
High Society (2015)
My Unfortunate Boyfriend (2015)
EXO Next Door (2015)
Drama Festival "4teen" (2014) (cameo)
Tears of Heaven (2014)
Trot Lovers (2014)
Drama Special "The Reason I'm Getting Married" (2014)
Emergency Couple (2014) (cameo, ep 1)
One Warm Word (2013)
Adolescence Medley (2013)
I Can Hear Your Voice (2013)
Iris II: New Generation (2013)
School 2013 (2012-2013)
The King of Dramas (2012-2013) 
Arang and the Magistrate (2012) 
Big (2012)
I Do, I Do (2012) 
Can't Live Without You (2012)
The Wedding Scheme (tvN, 2012) 
Korean Peninsula (2012) 
Padam Padam (2011-2012) 
Drama Special "Sorry I'm Late" (2011)
Ojakgyo Family (2011)
Baby Faced Beauty (2011) 
Sign (2011) (cameo)
Drama Special "Special Crime Squad MSS" (2011)
Smile, Mom (2010-2011)
Drama Special "Family Secrets" (2010)
Daemul (2010) 
Kim Su-ro, The Iron King (2010)
Becoming a Billionaire (2010)
Iris (2009) 
Smile, You (2009-2010)
The Accidental Couple (2009)
My Too Perfect Sons (2009) 
Ja Myung Go (2009)
Star's Lover (2008-2009) 
Drama City "러브 헌트, 서른 빼기 셋" (2008)
Painter of the Wind (2008)
Matchmaker's Lover (2008) 
Working Mom (2008) 
Lawyers of the Great Republic of Korea (2008)
Women of the Sun (2008)
Who Are You? (2008)
Lobbyist (2007)
Auction House (2007)
Drama City "Sky Lovers" (2007)
MBC Best Theater "적루몽" (MBC, 2007)
The Golden Age of Daughters-in-Law (2007-2008)
Kimchi Cheese Smile (2007)
Capital Scandal (2007)
Drama City "Crazy Love" (2007)
Air City (2007) 
MBC Best Theater "국물 있습니다" (2006)
Korea Secret Agency (2006)
The Invisible Man (2006)
MBC Best Theater "안녕 천사님" (2006)
Drama City "산사의 아침" (2005)
Sweet Spy (2005-2006)
Drama City "동행" (2004)
Drama City "칼 끝에 핀 꽃" (2004)
Drama City "우리 햄" (2004)
Jang Gil-san (2004)
My 19 Year Old Sister-in-Law (2004)
Desert Spring (2003)
King's Woman (2003-2004)
Love Letter (2003)
너희가 나라를 아느냐 (2002)
Saxophone and Chapssaltteok (2002) 
Empress Myeongseong (2001-2002)
Life is Beautiful (2001)
Medical Center (2000-2001)
Eyes of Dawn (1991-1992)
조선백자 마리아상 (1988)
Sunday Mystery Theater "그리고 아무도 없었다" (1987)

Variety show
Legend of Doctors (jTBC, 2013)
9 to 6 (MBC Every 1, 2013)
길,그곳에 가고싶다 (YTN, 2013)
Mystery Theater: Dangerous Invitation (Gyeongin Broadcasting, 2001)

Theater
A Personal History of Bong Dal-soo (2012)
Song of the Imperial Palace  (2010)
Educating Rita (1991, 2009) 
True West
The Brothers Karamazov
Duet
Antigone
Desire Under the Elms
Death of a Salesman
The Merchant of Venice
As You Like It
Chilsanri
Cabaret
The Great Wall of China

Awards
2021 KBS Drama Awards: Excellence Award, Actor in a Serial Drama	(Revolutionary Sisters) 
2009 KBS Drama Awards: Best Supporting Actor (Iris)
1998 22nd Seoul Performing Arts Festival: Best Actor
1997 33rd Baeksang Arts Awards: Best Theatre Actor
1995 Year in Theater: Top Excellence Award, Actor
1991 15th Seoul Performing Arts Festival: Best Actor
1990 연극인상
1987 5th Lee Hae-rang Prize for Theater 
1987 23rd Dong-A Theatre Awards: Best Actor (The Great Wall of China)
1987 극평가그룹상: Best Actor
1985 21st Dong-A Theatre Awards: Best Actor (True West)

References

External links
 
 
 

Living people
People from Yangpyeong County
South Korean male film actors
South Korean male television actors
South Korean male stage actors
1949 births
Best Actor Paeksang Arts Award (theatre) winners
Papyeong Yun clan